Lütfiye Ercimen (born October 5, 1987) is a Turkish women's football defender currently playing in the Turkish Women's First Football League for Kdz. Ereğli Belediye Spor with jersey number 14. She is a member of the Turkey women's national team since 2006.

Early life
Lütfiye Ercimen was born in Gerede town of Bolu Province, Turkey on October 5, 1987.

Club career

Lütfiye Ercimen began playing football in the Ankara-based club Gazi Üniversitesispor after obtaining her license on February 28, 2002. She became three times Women's First League champion with her team, in 2007, 2008 and 2010.

In October 2010, she transferred to Ataşehir Belediyesi, where she plays since then. There, she continued her league championship in 2011 and 2012, three times consecutively.

She made her first appearance in the 2011–12 UEFA Women's Champions League – Group 4 qualifying round match playing against the Lithuanian team Gintra Universitetas on August 11, 2011. The next season, she took part again at the UEFA Women's Champions League qualification matches.

In the second half of the 2016–17 League season, she transferred to Kdz. Ereğlispor. In the beginning of the 2017–18 League, she signed for the Istanbul-based Fatih Vatan Spor.

In October 2018, she returned to her former club Kdz. Ereğlispor.

International career
Ercimen made her national team debut in the 2004 UEFA Women's U-19 Championship First qualifying round match against Sweden women's national football team held on September 23, 2003. After playing five matches with the national U-19 team, she became a member of the senior team in 2006. As of September 19, 2012, she was capped 20 times in the national team scoring one goal.

Career statistics
.

Honours 
 Turkish Women's First Football League
 Gazi Üniversitesispor
 Winners (3): 2006–07, 2007–08, 2009–10
 Thrird place (1): 2008–09

 Ataşehir Belediyespor
 Winners (2): 2010–11, 2011–12
 Runners-up (4): 2012–13, 2013–14, 2014–15, 2015–16

References

External links

Living people
1987 births
People from Gerede
Turkish women's footballers
Women's association football defenders
Turkey women's international footballers
Gazi Üniversitesispor players
Ataşehir Belediyespor players
Karadeniz Ereğlispor players
Fatih Vatan Spor players
20th-century Turkish sportswomen
21st-century Turkish sportswomen